Max Walter Povse (born August 23, 1993) is an American professional baseball pitcher for the Frederick Atlantic League Team in the Atlantic League of Professional Baseball. He has played in Major League Baseball (MLB) for the Seattle Mariners.

Background 
Povse was born in Cary, North Carolina.  He attended Green Hope High School in Cary. After high school, he was drafted by the Los Angeles Dodgers in the 42nd round of the 2011 Major League Baseball draft. However, he did not sign with the Dodgers,  instead attending the University of North Carolina at Greensboro where he played college baseball for the UNC Greensboro Spartans.

Career

Atlanta Braves
After his junior year, Povse was drafted by the Atlanta Braves in the third round of the 2014 Major League Baseball draft. He signed with the Braves and made his professional debut with the rookie-level Danville Braves. In an August start against the Burlington Royals, Povse did not allow a hit until the seventh inning, sending Danville to a 10–1 win. He finished 2014 with a 4-2 record and a 3.42 ERA in 12 games (11 starts) for Danville. Povse spent 2015 with both the Single-A Rome Braves and High-A Carolina Mudcats, posting a combined 5-5 record and 4.15 ERA in 17 starts, and started 2016 with Carolina. He was later promoted to the Double-A Mississippi Braves. Povse finished 2016 with a combined 9-6 record and 3.36 ERA in 26 starts.

Seattle Mariners
On November 28, 2016, Povse and Rob Whalen were traded to the Seattle Mariners organization in exchange for Alex Jackson and Tyler Pike. Povse started 2017 with the Double-A Arkansas Travelers and was called up to the Mariners on June 18. He made his MLB debut on June 22, allowing 3 runs in two-thirds of an inning. He finished his rookie season with a 7.36 ERA in 3 major league appearances. He spent the 2018 season in the minor leagues, posting a 5-9 record and 5.46 ERA in 18 games between Arkansas and the Triple-A Tacoma Rainiers.

Povse was designated for assignment on January 27, 2019, following the signing of Hunter Strickland. He was outrighted on February 1, 2019. He was released by the Mariners on December 19, 2019.

High Point Rockers
On April 1, 2021, Povse signed with the High Point Rockers of the Atlantic League of Professional Baseball. Povse recorded a 9.82 ERA in 11 appearances with the Rockers.

West Virginia Power
On July 9, 2021, Povse was traded to the West Virginia Power of the Atlantic League of Professional Baseball. He became a free agent following the season.

Wild Health Genomes
On February 20, 2022, Povse signed with the Wild Health Genomes of the Atlantic League of Professional Baseball. Povse made 25 starts for the Genomes in 2022, recording a 6-10 record and 5.98 ERA with 129 strikeouts in 129.1 innings pitched. He became a free agent after the season.

Frederick Atlantic League Team
On March 20, 2023, Povse signed with the Frederick Atlantic League Team in the Atlantic League of Professional Baseball.

References

External links

UNC Greensboro Spartans bio

1993 births
Living people
People from Cary, North Carolina
Baseball players from North Carolina
Major League Baseball pitchers
Seattle Mariners players
UNC Greensboro Spartans baseball players
Danville Braves players
High Point Rockers players
Rome Braves players
Carolina Mudcats players
Mississippi Braves players
Arkansas Travelers players
Tacoma Rainiers players
Peoria Javelinas players
West Virginia Power players
Charleston Dirty Birds players
Kentucky Wild Health Genomes players